The 1991–92 Rugby League Divisional Premiership  was the 6th end-of-season Rugby League Divisional Premiership competition.

With the addition of a Third Division to the British professional rugby league system, the competition was expanded to 12 teams, and was contested by the top four teams in the second Division and the top eight teams in the third Division. The winners were Sheffield Eagles.

First round

Replay

Second round

Semi-finals

Final

See also
 1991–92 Rugby Football League season

Notes

References
 

Rugby League Divisional Premiership